Tymnos was a town of the Rhodian Peraea in ancient Caria, located on the bay Thymnias, which formed its harbour. It was a member of the Delian League.
 
Its site is located near Bozburun, Asiatic Turkey.

References

Populated places in ancient Caria
Former populated places in Turkey
Members of the Delian League
Marmaris District
History of Muğla Province